The 2018 Redditch Borough Council election took place on 3 May 2018 to elect members of Redditch Borough Council in England.  The Conservatives won control of the council from Labour with 17 seats, compared to 12 for Labour and 0 for the UKIP.

Background
Redditch Borough Council was one of the smallest councils in England to hold elections in 2018 and ten of its 29 councillors were up for election. The election came with the Labour majority council being under criticism for "controversial" proposals for four new 'quarters' of Redditch, the demolition of the library and police station and the relocation of the borough's civic headquarters.

Three sitting councillors did not seek re-election at this election (1 Labour, 2 Conservatives).

The Conservatives ultimately gained four seats to take their total to 17 and which meant that they took control of the council, the only example of a direct change of power from Labour to Conservatives at these elections. Labour lost three seats while UKIP lost its last remaining councillor in the Winyates ward. The result also meant that Labour no longer controlled any local authority in Worcestershire.

Results

Ward Results

Abbey

Astwood Bank & Feckenham

Batchley & Brockhill

Central

Church Hill

Crabbs Cross

Greenlands

Headless Cross & Oakenshaw

Lodge Park

Winyates

External links
Redditch local elections
Redditch Borough Council
2018 United Kingdom local elections

References

Redditch Borough Council election
2018
2010s in Worcestershire